GRH may refer to:
 Gartcosh railway station, in Scotland
 Gbiri-Niragu language
 Generalized Riemann hypothesis
 Gonadotropin-releasing hormone
 Gramm-Rudman-Hollings Balanced Budget Act